A Fazenda 11 is the eleventh season of the Brazilian reality television series A Fazenda, which premiered Tuesday, September 17, 2019, at 10:45 p.m. on RecordTV.

Marcos Mion returned as the main host, while actor Lucas Salles replaced Flávia Viana as the show's new special correspondent.

Contestants
Biographical information according to Record official series site, plus footnoted additions.
(ages stated are at time of contest)

Future Appearances
In 2022, Bifão appeared on De Férias com o Ex Caribe: Salseiro VIP as original cast member.

The game

Fire challenge
This season, contestants compete in the Fire challenge to win the Lamp power. The Lamp power entitles the holder the two flames (green and red) which may unleash good or bad consequences on the nomination process, with the red flame power defined by the public through of R7.com among two options.

The winner chooses a flame for himself and delegates which contestant holds the other. The Flame holder's choice is marked in bold.

Results

Voting history

Notes

Ratings and reception

Brazilian ratings
All numbers are in points and provided by Kantar Ibope Media.

References

External links
 A Fazenda 11 on R7.com 

2019 Brazilian television seasons
A Fazenda